Seek Limited (stylized as SEEK) is an Australian human resource consulting company. It is headquartered in Melbourne, Australia and operates in 12 countries: Australia, China, New Zealand, Mexico, Brazil, Nigeria, Indonesia, Hong Kong, Singapore, Philippines, Malaysia, Thailand and South Africa.

History
Seek was founded in November 1997 by Andrew Bassat, Paul Bassat and Matt Rockman as an online version of print employment classifieds, and it launched its website in March 1998. On 18 April 2005, Seek was floated on the Australian Securities Exchange with a market capitalisation of $587 million.

In May 2022, it moved its head office to a newly-constructed building in Cremorne.

References

Further reading
 
 
 
 "SEEK doubles down on Brazil, increases stake in Asia business". Sydney Morning Herald.

Companies based in Melbourne
Companies listed on the Australian Securities Exchange
Employment websites
Australian companies established in 1997